Kenneth Campbell Lochhead,  (May 22, 1926 – July 15, 2006) was a Canadian professor and painter. He was the brother of poet Douglas Lochhead.

Career
Born in Ottawa, Ontario, Lochhead attended the Summer Art School at Queen's University in 1944. From 1945 to 1948, he attended the Pennsylvania Academy of the Fine Arts in Philadelphia. From 1946 to 1948, he studied at the Barnes Foundation near Philadelphia.

From 1950 to 1964, he was the director of the School of Art at the University of Saskatchewan – Regina Campus. Among his pupils there was Joan Rankin. From 1964 to 1973, he was an associate professor in the School of Fine Arts at the University of Manitoba. From 1973 to 1975, he was a professor in the Department of Visual Arts, Faculty of Fine Arts at York University. From 1975 to 1989, he was a professor in the Department of Visual Arts at the University of Ottawa.

In 1961, he exhibited his paintings as part of the Regina Five at the National Gallery of Canada with Art McKay, Ron Bloore, Ted Godwin, and Doug Morton. Along with McKay, ne was included in Clement Greenberg's 1964 Post-Painterly Abstraction exhibition.

In 1970, he was made an Officer of the Order of Canada "for his contribution to the development of painting, especially in Western Canada, as an artist and teacher". In 2006, he was awarded the Governor General's Awards in Visual and Media Arts. He was made a member of the Royal Canadian Academy of Arts

He died of colorectal cancer in Ottawa in 2006.

Books illustrated
Looking into Trees (Sackville NB: Sybertooth, 2009)

References

External links
 
 Kenneth Lochhead's official website
 University of Regina Archives and Special Collections.  Ken Lochhead Fonds. https://www.uregina.ca/library/services/archives/collections/art-architecture/lockhhead.html

1926 births
2006 deaths
Deaths from colorectal cancer
20th-century Canadian painters
Canadian male painters
21st-century Canadian painters
Officers of the Order of Canada
Artists from Ottawa
Academic staff of the University of Manitoba
Academic staff of the University of Ottawa
Academic staff of the University of Saskatchewan
Academic staff of York University
Deaths from cancer in Ontario
Artists from Saskatchewan
Members of the Royal Canadian Academy of Arts
Governor General's Award in Visual and Media Arts winners
20th-century Canadian male artists
21st-century Canadian male artists
Canadian abstract artists